Supakorn Kitsuwon (born December 28, 1972, in Uthai Thani Province, Thailand) (nickname Tok )  is a Thai film and stage actor. Among his starring roles are as Pan in Monrak Transistor and Khun Krabi in SARS Wars. He had notable supporting roles in Tears of the Black Tiger as Mahesuan and in Dang Bireley's and Young Gangsters as Pu Bottlebomb.

Kitsuwon graduated from Amnuay Silpa School and a diploma from Canada. He entered the showbiz in the early 90's as a model and backup dancer for famous singer and rapper Jetrin Wattanasin.

Filmography
 Dang Bireley's and Young Gangsters (1997) as Pu Bottlebomb
 Crime Kings (1998)
 Extra Legal (1999)
 Tears of the Black Tiger (2000) as Mahesuan
 The Legend of Suriyothai (2001) as Sir Sriyod
 Monrak Transistor (2001) as Phaen (Pan)
 Goodman Town (2002)
 Ukkabat (The Meteor) (2004) - Oam
 SARS Wars (2004) - Khun Krabii
 Perfect Killer (2005) as Kieb
 Rambo (2008) as Myint
 Busaba Bold and Beautiful (Suay Sing Krating Sab) (2008) as Pod
 Art of the Devil 3 (Llong khong 2) (2008) as Dis
 Puen yai jon salad (2008) as Chief of Yahol Pirates
 Ong Bak 2 (2008) as Master Armer
 Young Bao the Movie (2013) as Thanis
 Adam (2017)
 The 400 Bravers (2018)
 Sisters (2019)
 Khun Phaen Begins (2019) as Master Det

Television dramas
 2000 Mae Nak Phra Khanong (2000) (แม่นากพระโขนง) (Step Aonvert/Ch.3) as Mak (มาก) with Kullanat Preeyawat
 2001 Keuy Ban Nok (2001) (เขยบ้านนอก) (TV Scene & Picture/Ch.3) as Kamnuan Lhaopana with Athitaya Dithipen
 2003 Saming Baan Rai (2003) (สมิงบ้านไร่) (K.K.N Entertainment/Ch.3) as Saming Baan Rai (สมิง บ้านไร่) with Kullanat Preeyawat
 2003 Pleng Ruk Pleng Puern (2003) (เพลงรักเพลงปืน) (Step Aonvert/Ch.3) as Sommai / Chaitae with Kullanat Preeyawat
 2008 Choom Tang Seur Phen (2008) (ชุมทางเสือเผ่น) (Uma 99/Ch.3) as  
 2009 Thepabut Chood Win (2009) (เทพบุตรชุดวิน) (/Ch.3) as  
 2010 Sai Soke (2010) (ไทรโศก) (No Problem/Ch.3) as  
 2010 The Seven Fighters (2010) (7 ประจัญบาน) (SUK SAN HUN SA 52/Ch.3) as Chuk Biaosakun 
 2010  (หัวใจรักข้ามภพ) (Cholumpi Production/Ch.3) as  
 2012 Meu Prab Por Look Orn (2012) (มือปราบพ่อลูกอ่อน) (Cholumpi Production/Ch.3) as  
 2012  (แม่แตงร่มใบ) (Step Aonvert/Ch.3) as Songchai (ทรงชัย) 
 2013  (บ่วงบาป) (Polyplus/Ch.3) as Nai Som (นายสม) 
 2014 Koom Nang Kruan (2014) (คุ้มนางครวญ) (Exact-Scenario/Ch.5) as Thenkraam 
 2015 Patiharn Ruk Karn Kob Fah (ปาฏิหาริย์รักข้ามขอบฟ้า) (Raklakorn/Ch.3) as Moya (Cameo) (โมยา (รับเชิญ)) 
 2015 Krasue Mahanakorn (กระสือมหานคร) (/Ch.3) as  
 2016  (มือปราบสายเดี่ยว) (/Ch.3) as  
 2016 Padiwarada (ปดิวรัดา) (Good Feeling/Ch.3) as White Tiger (เสือขาว) 
 2016  (กาลครั้งหนึ่งในหัวใจ) (/Ch.7) as Thian-Kong (เทียนคง) 
 2017  (เชลยศึก) (/Ch.8) as Chai (ชัย) (Cameo)
 2017 Mue Nuer Mek (มือเหนือเมฆ) (Nine Bever Films/Ch.7) as Yai (ใหญ่) 
 2019 Bai Mai Tee Plid Plew (ใบไม้ที่ปลิดปลิว) (The One Enterprise-CHANGE2561/One 31) as Pornchai (พรชัย) (Cameo)
 2020  (สัญญารัก สัญญาณลวง) (/Ch.3) as  
 2020 Soot Rak Sap E-Lee (สูตรรักแซ่บอีหลี) (The One Enterprise/One 31) as Anawat Thanapongpat (อนวัช ธนพงษ์พัฒน์) with Vichuda Pindum
 2022 Khru Ma (ครูมะ ห้อง ป.3 ก.) (เก้าพระคุ้มครอง, Film Z Bangkok, Film Z/Thai PBS) as Kroo Yai (ครูใหญ่)
 2022 My Lovely Bodyguard (หัวใจรักพิทักษ์เธอ) (The One Enterprise/One 31) as Dech (Sergeant) 
 2023 Nang Nak Saphai Phra Khanong (นางนาค สะใภ้พระโขนง) (Raruek Production/Workpoint TV) as Moen Wai Phanuphab (หมื่นไวยภานุภาพ) 
 2023 Pah Nang Suer (ป่านางเสือ) (D One TV/Ch.3) as Saeng (แสง) with Natharinee Kanasoot
 2023 Luert Chao Phraya (เลือดเจ้าพระยา) (Arlong Group/Ch.3) as Sua Hian (เสือเฮี้ยน) 
 20  (มือปราบกระทะรั่ว) (/Ch.3) as 
 20 Wongsakanayat 2022 (วงศาคณาญาติ) (CHANGE2561/Amarin TV) as Chalong (ฉลอง) with Rujira Chuaykua (Khem)

Television series
 2022 Astrophile (คืนนับดาว Astrophile) (The One Enterprise-GMMTV/GMM 25) as Nubdao's father (พ่อของนับดาว) with Supranee Jayrinpon (Cameo)
 2022 Thai Cave Rescue (ถ้ำหลวง: ภารกิจแห่งความหวัง) (Netflix/Ch.3) as Saman Kunan (Sam) (น.ต. สมาน กุนัน (จ่าแซม)) with ทัศรินทร์ พันธุ์แพ

Television sitcom
 2011  (ผู้กองเจ้าเสน่ห์) (Exact-Scenario/Ch.3) as 

Mc 
Television
 2014 Muay Duang 8 Thid (มวยดัง 8 ทิศ) (Lumpinee Boxing Stadium/Ch.8) (2014)

Online
 20  YouTube : Supakorn Kitsuwon

References

External links

Living people
1972 births
Supakorn Kitsuwon
Supakorn Kitsuwon
Supakorn Kitsuwon
Supakorn Kitsuwon
Supakorn Kitsuwon
Supakorn Kitsuwon
Supakorn Kitsuwon
Supakorn Kitsuwon
Supakorn Kitsuwon
Supakorn Kitsuwon